The Double Event is a 1934 British film directed by Leslie Howard Gordon. It marked the screen debut of Bernard Lee.

Cast
Jane Baxter as Evelyn Martingale
Ruth Taylor as Aunt Laura
O. B. Clarence as Rev. Martingale
Alexander Field as Charlie Weir
Bernard Lee as Dennison
Sebastian Smith as Uncle James

References

External links

1934 films
British black-and-white films
British comedy films
1934 comedy films
1930s British films